Robert Miles Fletcher Cameron (3 May 1877 – 12 June 1960) was an Australian rules footballer who played with Carlton in the Victorian Football League (VFL). His last game came in the final round of the 1897 season, a 32-point loss to Collingwood.

Following his football career, he graduated from university and set up a medical practice in Boulder, Western Australia. He volunteered for the army during World War I, and was a part of the Gallipoli Campaign. He was promoted to the rank of captain, and returned to Australia after serving in France on the Western Front.

Notes

External links 

Bob Cameron's profile at Blueseum

1877 births
Australian rules footballers from Victoria (Australia)
Carlton Football Club players
Australian military personnel of World War I
1960 deaths
Australian medical doctors
Military personnel from Victoria (Australia)